Charles Rudolph Nesbitt, Jr. (August 30, 1921 – July 5, 2007) was an Oklahoma attorney and politician. He held several political positions in the Oklahoma state government, having served as the 9th Attorney General of Oklahoma (1963–1967), a member of the Oklahoma Corporation Commission (1969–1975), and as Oklahoma Secretary of Energy under Governor David Walters (1991–1995).

Biography
Charles Nesbitt was born in Miami, Oklahoma, on August 30, 1921. His father was Charles Rudolph, Sr., also an attorney, and his mother was Irma Wilhelmi Nesbitt. He had one sister, Ilse Louise. He lived for a while in Tulsa, where he graduated from Central High School. He went on to earn a B.S. in Government from University of Oklahoma in 1942. He attended basic training for the Army at Ft. Sill, Oklahoma, where he became a second lieutenant, after which he served under General George S. Patton as a tank gunnery specialist.  He retired from the Army in 1950 with the rank of Major. He later enrolled in law school at Yale University and graduated with his Juris Doctor in 1947, shortly after working as a clerk under a district judge, Bower Broaddus.  Nesbitt went into private practice, specializing in oil and gas, and was involved in Oklahoma politics. He retired in 2001.

Personal
Nesbitt met Margôt Dorothy Lord while both were attending the University of Oklahoma. They married in 1948, after he returned from Europe. In 1954, they settled in Heritage Hills, a neighborhood in Oklahoma City, where they continued to reside at the time of his death. 
Margôt, formerly an Episcopal priest at St. Paul's Cathedral (Oklahoma City), remained in Oklahoma until her death in 2021.

Nesbitt died on July 5, 2007 at the age of 85. Nesbitt was survived by his wife Margôt; three children, Nancy, Douglas, and Carolyn and their spouses; and his grandchildren, Matthew, Anne, Christopher, Philip, Patrick, and Daniel; as well as his sister, Ilse and her family.

Political office holdings
 Oklahoma Attorney General (Democrat) 1962-1967 
 Oklahoma Corporation Commissioner 1968-1973
 Oklahoma Energy Secretary 1991-1995

Notes

References

See also
 Bower Slack Broaddus

1921 births
2007 deaths
People from Miami, Oklahoma
Lawyers from Oklahoma City
Oklahoma lawyers
Oklahoma Attorneys General
Corporation Commissioners of Oklahoma
State cabinet secretaries of Oklahoma
Oklahoma Democrats
University of Oklahoma alumni
Yale Law School alumni
20th-century American politicians
20th-century American lawyers
United States Army personnel of World War II